Urânia Vanério de Argollo Ferrão (Salvador, 14 December 1811 — 3 December 1849) was a Brazilian teacher, writer and translator. In her childhood she witnessed the conflict between Brazilian and Portuguese troops in early 1822, in the context of the  process, which led her to write the poem "Lamentos de uma Baiana..." ("Laments of a girl from Bahia").

Life

Childhood
Urânia Vanério was born in Salvador on December 14, 1811, the daughter of Portuguese educators Euzébio Vanério and Samoa Angélica Vanério, a family without possessions. Since childhood she was stimulated to study, coming to master the languages French, English and Italian, as well as other skills such as embroidery, drawing and music, that along with her physical beauty, impressed the ladies from the region.

Lamentos de uma Baiana
"Lamentos de uma Baiana..." was a pamphlet written between February 19 and 21, 1822, when Urânia was only 10 years old, presenting her revolt against the government of Inácio Luís Madeira de Melo, loyal to Portugal and commander of the Portuguese Auxiliary Troop. The work was published in Rio de Janeiro, presenting the wrong age of Urânia, by Ângelo da Costa Ferreira and had its publication announced on October 21, 1822 by the Diário do Rio de Janeiro with the price of 80 réis. The authorship of the work was largely forgotten for two centuries; Brazilian historian Patrícia Valim has stated that this was due to the erasure of women's struggles from official history.

In the text, she reveals her concern with the outcome of the war and the fate of her family, and refers to the murder of Sister Joana Angélica, who was killed by bayonet blows when Portuguese troops tried to invade the Lapa Convent. She also sought to reinforce her support for Brazil's Independence, as well as repudiate the conflicts caused by the "Royal Charter of July 8, 1820," which emancipated Sergipe. As she wrote, she was overcome with emotion was worried about the safety of her father, Portuguese, and to calm her down she said: "Your father will always be a Brazilian".

Youth
Months after the pamphlet was written, Urânia's family moved to the  due to the fact that her father had joined the Interim Council of the Cachoeira city government.

With this, she returned to Salvador with her mother and the following year her mother returned to work at the "Desejo da Ciência para a educação da mocidade baianense" school ("Science's Wish for the Education of Bahia's Youth"), that she had founded with her husband, and where Urânia already worked at as a child. Upon leaving prison, Euzébio Vanério went back to work at the newspaper O Grito da Razão.

With this, Urânia went back to work with her parents.

Adult life

On 1 March 1827, at 15, Urânia married Captain Felisberto Gomes de Argollo Ferrão (1802-1876), son of one of the wealthiest families in the province.

On December 11, 1827, the Diário do Rio de Janeiro announced the publication of the work "Triumpho do Patriotismo, Novela Americana", for 200 réis. The work, originally written by M. de Florian, had already been announced by the Diário Fluminense in 1826, explaining that it was a translation produced by Urânia Vanério, which may make her the first woman translator in Brazil, preceding Nísia Floresta by a decade.

Urânia Vanério and her husband continued living in Salvador, in the  neighborhood, while she continued teaching at the school founded by her parents. In twenty-two years of marriage, Urânia had thirteen children, with two dying in infancy.

Death

On 3 December 1849 Urânia Vanério died of an infection from the birth of her last child, and was buried at the Church of the Holy House of Mercy, where members of distinguished families were buried. Her daughters became teachers in the same school where she worked, and her sons became businessmen and politicians of some local and national relevance.

Legacy

The authors of the collection "Guerra Literária" (2014) describe the pamphlet "Lamentos de uma Baiana" as the most "... outraged and painful protest against the action of General Madeira de Melo's troops, expressed in simple and direct language...", however, the author's name was not indicated. 

Historian Patrícia Valim describes that the trajectory of Urânia Vanério has great importance for demonstrating the strategies that women of the time used in favor of their political engagement, for the fight against oppression, for justice and equality and that her pamphlet, which may have been originally made to defend her parents against possible attacks, "...gained body and became one of the most potent critiques against the arbitrary actions of the Portuguese absolutism in Bahia, the colonial exploitation and the violence of the imperial troops against the population of Salvador".

Historical Rescue
The story of Urânia Vanério and the authorship of her pamphlet was rescued in the 21st century through historian Patrícia Valim's research, which led to the podcast described below and which resulted in a chapter written by the historian in the 2022 book "As mulheres que estavam lá" ("The Women Who Were There").

Popular Culture

Works
"Lamentos de huma bahiana na triste crise, em que vio sua patria oppressa pelo despotismo constitucional da tropa auxiliadora de Portugal, para empossar no governo das armas a I. L. Madeira de Mello, por virtude da carta regia, que deo causa á guerra da carta regia, ou carnaval desastroso". Rio de Janeiro, in Typographia Nacional, 1822, in- 4º de 8 pp. num.
En: "Laments of a girl from Bahia in the sad crisis, in which she saw her homeland oppressed by the constitutional despotism of the auxiliary troops of Portugal, to swear in the government of the arms to I. L. Madeira de Melo, by virtue of the royal charter, which caused the war of the royal charter, or disastrous carnival"

References

Notes

Bibliography

(Organized by date)

External link

1811 births
1849 deaths
Brazilian translators
Brazilian women poets
Brazilian women academics
French–Portuguese translators
19th-century Brazilian women writers
Brazilian people of Portuguese descent